Cutbona (Konkani: Kutbonn), is a village subdivision located within the Velim village, neighbouring Betul. It is situated in the Salcete taluka and falls under the South Goa district, in the Indian coastal state of Goa. It is famous for its fishing jetty known as the Cutbona fishing jetty, which is South Goa's largest fishing hub, where over 300 trawlers operate. It is also a part of the Velim Assembly constituency.

Local issues
Over five years from 2017, the traditional fishing communities of Cutbona and Betul had to face issues of the breakwater facility at the mouth of the Sal river. Many protests were held over the delay of the construction of this facility by the Fisheries department of the state government. As of 19 September 2022, The Chief Minister of Goa, Pramod Sawant has given assurance that the work will commence soon.

References

Geography of South Goa district